Sebastian William Gregory "Seb" Rodger (born 29 June 1991) is a British athlete specialising in the 400 metres hurdles. In 2013, he won a silver medal at the European U23 Championships and reached the semifinals of the World Championships. He also represented Great Britain at the 2016 Olympic Games in Rio de Janeiro, Brazil.

Career
Rodger, who was born in Brighton, began concentrating on the 400 metres hurdles in 2011, having previously been a decathlete with a personal best score of 7200 points in 2010. His personal best in the 400 metres hurdles is 49.19 seconds set in Tampere in 2013, when winning a silver medal at the European U23 Championships. He was a semi-finalist at the 2013 World Championships. In June 2016, he won the British Championship title in Birmingham in 49.45 secs, before running a season's best of 49.29 in Oordegem in July to seal Olympic selection. At the 2016 Rio Olympics, he was eliminated in the heats running 49.54 secs.

Competition record

References

1991 births
Living people
Sportspeople from Brighton
English male hurdlers
British male hurdlers
Olympic male hurdlers
Olympic athletes of Great Britain
Athletes (track and field) at the 2016 Summer Olympics
Commonwealth Games competitors for England
Athletes (track and field) at the 2014 Commonwealth Games
World Athletics Championships athletes for Great Britain
British Athletics Championships winners